Praying to God is the act of performing a prayer to God in a monotheist or henotheist context.

The phrase "Pray to God" may also refer to:

 "Pray to God" (song), a song by Calvin Harris featuring Haim
 Prie-dieu (literally "pray to God"), a desk for private devotional use

See also
 Prayer to God, a 2000 song by Shellac from the album 1000 Hurts
 Prayer of God, the angel "צלתיאל", or Selaphiel
 Lord's Prayer (disambiguation)